Kalutura Urban Council (KUC) is the local authority for the town of Kalutara in the Kalutara District, Western Province, Sri Lanka. The KUC is responsible for providing a variety of local public services including roads, sanitation, drains, housing, libraries, public parks and recreational facilities. It has 20 councillors elected using an open list proportional representation system.

History
The Kalutara Urban Council was established in 1878 as the Kalutara Divisional Health Council. The inaugural Divisional Health Council consisted of a chairman, two officers and three elected members. The first elected chairman was T. R. Sonders and the first secretary was H. H. Kamoran.
 
The Divisional Health Council operated between 1878 and 15 December 1922.

The first Urban Council meeting was held on 6 January 1923 and the first elected chairman was Arthur D. Abrew.

Election results

2018 local government election
Results of the local government election held on 8 February 2018:

2011 local government election
Results of the local government election held on 17 March 2011:

References

Kalutara
Local authorities in Western Province, Sri Lanka
Urban councils of Sri Lanka